Tony Jones (born 26 May 1958) is a football broadcaster based in England. He has contributed to UK commercial broadcasting outlets Sky Sports, five, Channel 4 and ITV - commentating on everything from the UEFA Champions League to the English non-League.

He has been part of the Hostbroadcastservices (HBS) team at three FIFA World Cups, and his voice has been heard on games distributed overseas by IMG among others.

He has won a Royal Television Society award for his sports reporting, and has also been responsible for producing several programmes.

Work with ITV 

Jones began his television career in ITV in 1982 at Anglia Television in Norwich.

Jones commentated on football and produced a number of programmes  - including an insight into the horse racing industry and the arrival in England of Sergei Baltacha, a Ukrainian who was the first footballer from the old Soviet Union to play in Britain during the Glasnost era. He also won a Royal Television Society award for his journalism.

For the ITV network, he was a regular contributor to the Football League review shows The Championship and Football League Extra. He also worked on ITV's FA Cup, Europa League and UEFA Cup programming.

Work with Channel 4 
Jones has worked with Channel 4, commentating on the 2012 London Paralympic Games and the 2012 BT Paralympic World Cup.

Work with five 
Jones commentated on Five's Football Italiano show. With five Jones also covered live UEFA Cup games and international fixtures.

Work with Sky Sports 

Jones has been covering games for Sky Sports since 2001, starting with Spain's La Liga and the German Bundesliga.

In 2004, he became part of their team of commentators for Football First (more recently Match Choice), covering the English Premier League for audiences both in the UK and overseas.

He was also a regular member of their UEFA Champions League commentary team.

Work with Premier League Productions

Jones also commentates on matches for Premier League Productions, a venture of IMG Sports Media who produce, package and broadcast games live for the Premier League's international broadcast partners worldwide. The same productions are also shown domestically for highlights packages on Football First.

Other Credits 

Other credits include four FIFA World Cups, three UEFA European Championships and the Copa América, which in 2011 was also streamed by Google.

Since 2013, Jones has provided the English international commentary for the UEFA Champions League and UEFA Europa League finals, along with the UEFA Super Cup.

In October 2009, he was commentator when the Ukraine v. England FIFA World Cup qualifying fixture became Britain's biggest internet pay-to-view sports broadcast. Around 500,000 watched the game - produced by the Perform Group and their partners Kentaro, an international football agency.

Although his work is mostly associated with football, Jones has covered several other sports. He has been heard on programming for the Olympic Games, the FINA World Swimming Championship and the Commonwealth Games.

His journalistic career started at the Cheshire Observer newspaper, and his first radio work followed at Liverpool's Radio City.

References 

British association football commentators
Living people
1958 births
Place of birth missing (living people)